John Wade Brorby (born May 23, 1934) is an inactive Senior United States circuit judge of the United States Court of Appeals for the Tenth Circuit.

Education and career
Born in Omaha, Nebraska, Brorby received a Bachelor of Science degree from the University of Wyoming in 1956 and a Juris Doctor from the University of Wyoming College of Law in 1958. While at the University of Wyoming, he was in the Air Force Reserve Officers Training Corps (ROTC). After graduation from law school, he was in the United States Air Force from 1958 to 1961, where he served in the Judge Advocate General's Corps as a legal officer. He became a captain. He was in private practice in Gillette, Wyoming from 1961 to 1988, serving as a county and prosecuting attorney of Campbell County, Wyoming from 1963 to 1970.

Federal judicial service
On August 7, 1987, Brorby was nominated by President Ronald Reagan to a seat on the United States Court of Appeals for the Tenth Circuit vacated by Judge James E. Barrett. Brorby was confirmed by the United States Senate on February 16, 1988, and received his commission on February 17, 1988. He assumed senior status on May 25, 2001.

References

Sources

1934 births
Living people
20th-century American judges
United States Air Force Judge Advocate General's Corps
Judges of the United States Court of Appeals for the Tenth Circuit
People from Gillette, Wyoming
United States court of appeals judges appointed by Ronald Reagan
United States Air Force officers
University of Wyoming College of Law alumni